Traditional ginger beer is a sweetened and carbonated, usually non-alcoholic beverage. Historically it was produced by the natural fermentation of prepared ginger spice, yeast and sugar.

Current ginger beers are often manufactured rather than brewed, frequently with flavour and colour additives, with artificial carbonation. Ginger ales are not brewed.

Ginger beer's origins date from the colonial spice trade with the Orient and the sugar-producing islands of the Caribbean. It was popular in Britain and its colonies from the 18th century. Other spices were variously added and any alcohol content was limited to 2% by excise tax laws in 1855. Few brewers have maintained an alcoholic product.

Ginger beer is still produced at home using a symbiotic colony of yeast and a Lactobacillus (bacteria) known as a "ginger beer plant" or from a "ginger bug" starter created from fermenting ginger, sugar, and water.

History
Brewed ginger beer originated in Yorkshire in England in the mid-18th century and became popular throughout Britain, the United States, Ireland, South Africa and Canada, reaching a peak of popularity in the early 20th century.

Production

Alcoholic ginger beer

Brewed ginger beer originated in the UK, but is sold worldwide. Crabbie's is a popular brand in the UK. It is usually labelled "alcoholic ginger beer" to distinguish it from the more established commercial ginger beers, which are often not brewed using fermentation but carbonated with pressurized carbon dioxide, though traditional non-alcoholic ginger beer may also be produced by brewing.

Ginger beer plant

Ginger beer plant (GBP), a form of fermentation starter, is used to create the fermentation process. Also known as "bees wine", "Palestinian bees", "Californian bees", and "balm of Gilead", it is not a plant but a composite organism comprising the yeast Saccharomyces florentinus (formerly S. pyriformis) and the bacterium Lactobacillus hilgardii (formerly Brevibacterium vermiforme), which form a symbiotic culture of bacteria and yeast (SCOBY). It forms a gelatinous substance that allows it to be easily transferred from one fermenting substrate to the next, much like kefir grains, kombucha, and tibicos.

The GBP was first described by Harry Marshall Ward in 1892, from samples he received in 1887. Original ginger beer is brewed by leaving water, sugar, ginger, optional ingredients such as lemon juice and cream of tartar, and GBP to ferment for several days, converting some of the sugar into alcohol. GBP may be obtained from several commercial sources. Until about 2008 laboratory-grade GBP was available only from the yeast bank Deutsche Sammlung von Mikroorganismen und Zellkulturen in Germany (catalogue number DMS 2484), but the item is no longer listed. The National Collection of Yeast Cultures (NCYC) had an old sample of "Bees wine" , but current staff have not used it, and NCYC are unable to supply it for safety reasons, as the exact composition of the sample is unknown.

In the UK, the origins of the original ginger beer plant is unknown. When a batch of ginger beer was made using some ginger beer "plant" (GBP), the jelly-like residue was also bottled and became the new GBP. Some of this GBP was kept for making the next batch of ginger beer, and some was given to friends and family, so the plant was passed on through generations. Following Ward's research and experiments, he created his own ginger beer from a new plant that he had made, and he proposed, but did not prove, that the plant was created by contaminants found on the raw materials, with the yeast coming from the raw brown sugar and the bacteria coming from the ginger root.

Yeast starter
An alternative method of instigating fermentation is using a ginger beer starter, often called a "ginger bug", which can be made by fermenting a mixture of water, brewer's or baker's yeast (not the SCOBY described above), ginger, and sugar. This is kept for a week or longer, with sugar regularly added, e.g., daily, to increase alcohol content. More ginger may also be added. When finished, this concentrated mix is strained, diluted with water and lemon juice, and bottled. This is the process used by some commercial ginger beer makers. Ginger beer made from a yeast-based starter is reported to not have the same taste or mouth feel as that made with ginger beer plant. The near-complete loss of the ginger beer plant is likely due to the decrease in home brewing and the increased commercial production of ginger beer in the late 1800s and early 1900s. Large-scale breweries favoured the use of yeast, as used in conventional beer-making, because of ease for scaled production.

Ginger beer soft drink
Non-alcoholic ginger beer is a type of carbonated soft drink flavoured with ginger. An example is Stoney, a product of The Coca-Cola Company widely sold in southern and eastern Africa. Fentimans ginger beer from the United Kingdom is an example of a non-alcoholic ginger beer that is produced by fermentation.

Mixed drinks

The ginger beer soft drink may be mixed with beer (usually a British ale of some sort) to make one type of shandy, or with dark rum to make a drink, originally from Bermuda, called a Dark 'N' Stormy. It is the main ingredient in the Moscow Mule cocktail, though ginger ale may be substituted when ginger beer is unavailable.

See also

 Ginger ale
 Crabbie's
 Root beer
 Barritt's Ginger Beer
 Sockerdricka
 Caribbean cuisine
 Ginger wine
 Canton (liqueur)
 Socată
 Tilda (cocktail)
 List of soft drink flavors
 Donoghue v. Stevenson, legal case involving ginger beer

References

External links

 Of the Street Sale of Ginger-Beer, Sherbet, Lemonade,&C., from London Labour and the London Poor, Volume 1, Henry Mayhew, 1851; subsequent pages cover the costs and income of street ginger beer sellers.
 http://www.scienceinschool.org/sites/default/files/issuePdf/issue8.pdf

 
Fermented drinks
Types of beer
Beer
Soft drinks
Jamaican cuisine
Yorkshire cuisine
Cuisine of the Ionian Islands
Ginger soda
Guyanese cuisine